"Gimme" is a song recorded by Cypriot boy band One, written by Giorgos Theofanous. It is best known as the  entry at the Eurovision Song Contest 2002, held in Tallinn.

Background
The song is a boy band number, with a girl being asked to give a sign that she loves the singer. The band recorded the song in English, Greek ("") and Spanish ("Dame") and was released over two CD singles.

Eurovision
The song was performed first on the night, followed by the 's Jessica Garlick with "Come Back". It was the first time in the contest that the Cypriot entry did not feature any Greek lyrics as it was performed fully in English. At the close of voting, it had received 85 points, placing 6th in a field of 24.

A few seconds after the lead singer Constantinos Christoforou began singing, a technical hitch led to a caption bearing the words 'the ugly duckling' on the background video screen (it was the postcard meant to be shown before the United Kingdom's performance). The picture of the stage was quickly brought back.

Constantinos Christoforou had already participated for Cyprus at the Eurovision Song Contest 1996 with the song "Mono Yia Mas". He would later make a further solo appearance at the 2005 contest with "Ela Ela (Come Baby)" after the band formally disbanded. Therefore, the song represents the middle leg in a rare sequence of a Eurovision contestant performing solo, then as a member of a vocal group, before a second solo performance.

Charts

References

2002 singles
Eurovision songs of Cyprus
Eurovision songs of 2002
One (band) songs
2002 songs
Songs written by Giorgos Theofanous